The Malaysia M5 league (Malay: Liga M5 Malaysia) is a fourth level of the Malaysian football league system. The league was created in 2018 as a part of the Malaysian Football League’s plan to reform the Malaysia football league structure.

League system

 Note: League names highlighted in bold are level 5 football leagues in the Malaysian football pyramid

See also
 Liga Semi-Pro
 Liga Premier
 Liga Super
 Piala FA
 Piala Malaysia
 FAM Football Awards

References

External links 

History of football in Malaysia
4